Gerald Dwayne Jones (born January 11, 1933) is an American politician in the state of Iowa.

Jones was born in Silver City, Iowa. He attended the University of California, Santa Barbara and worked in property management. A Republican, he served in the Iowa House of Representatives from 2001 to 2007 (85th district).

References

1933 births
Living people
People from Mills County, Iowa
University of California, Santa Barbara alumni
Businesspeople from Iowa
Republican Party members of the Iowa House of Representatives